The Papua New Guinea national cricket team toured Hong Kong in November 2016 to play three One Day Internationals (ODIs) matches at Mission Road Ground, Mong Kok. Hong Kong won the series 2–1.

Squads

ODI series

1st ODI

2nd ODI

3rd ODI

References

External links
 Series home at ESPN Cricinfo

2016 in Papua New Guinean cricket
2016 in Hong Kong cricket
Papua New Guinean  cricket tours of Hong Kong
International cricket competitions in 2016–17
PNG 2016